The 1980 United Virginia Bank Classic, also known as the Richmond WCT, was a men's tennis tournament played on indoor carpet courts at the Richmond Coliseum in Richmond, Virginia, United States. The event was part of World Championship Tennis category of the 1980 Volvo Grand Prix circuit. It was the 15th edition of the tournament and was held from January 28 through February 3, 1980. First-seeded John McEnroe won the singles title and the $30,200 first-prize money.

Finals

Singles
 John McEnroe defeated  Roscoe Tanner 6–1, 6–2
 It was McEnroe's 1st singles title of the year and the 16th of his career.

Doubles
 Fritz Buehning /  Johan Kriek defeated  Brian Gottfried /  Frew McMillan 3–6, 6–3, 7–6(7–3)

References

External links
 ITF tournament edition details

United Virginia Bank Classic
United Virginia Bank Classic
United Virginia Bank Classic
United Virginia Bank Classic